Hoof Marks is a 1927 American silent Western film directed by Tenny Wright and starring Jack Donovan, Ed Brady and Edward Cecil.

Cast
 Jack Donovan as Cal Wagner 
 Ed Brady as Rawhide Smith 
 Edward Cecil as Harold Cole 
 William Steele as Sam Trapp 
 Peggy Montgomery as Alice Dixon 
 Peggy O'Day as Henrietta Bowers 
 Peggy Shaw as Marie Hudson

References

External links
 

1927 films
1927 Western (genre) films
American black-and-white films
Pathé Exchange films
Films directed by Tenny Wright
Silent American Western (genre) films
1920s English-language films
1920s American films